Fairing may refer to:

Aerodynamics and hydrodynamics
Aircraft fairing, a structure in aircraft design used to reduce drag and improve appearance
Bicycle fairing, a type of fairing coverage for bicycles
Motorcycle fairing, a type of fairing applied to motorcycles
Payload fairing, an aerodynamic structure that encapsulates the payload of a rocket-powered launch vehicle
Cable fairing, a form of fairing applied to towed cables, primarily in marine environments

Other uses
Cornish fairing, a type of ginger biscuit
China fairing, a type of porcelain figurine

See also
Fair (disambiguation)
Feiring (disambiguation)